Spruce Mountain is a mountain in the Kayaderosseras Range in the town of Corinth in Saratoga County, New York. The  summit is accessible via a  trail and is topped with a  fire tower affording a more than  panoramic view from the Adirondacks to the Catskills, and east to Vermont. The tower, built in 1928 and refurbished in 2015, is one of only 23 remaining in the Adirondack Mountains.

References

External links

Mountains of Saratoga County, New York
Tourist attractions in Saratoga County, New York
Mountains of New York (state)